Three Men in White is a 1944 American comedy-drama film in the Dr Kildare series directed by Willis Goldbeck. It stars Lionel Barrymore, Van Johnson, and Marilyn Maxwell. Ava Gardner has a supporting role.

The plot threads include the competition between Ames and How to be Gillespie's new assistant, Ames' involvement with a beautiful young woman who passed out in a car, presumably from drinking but in fact had no alcohol in her system, and her mother, whose intense arthritis has her kept in a neck brace and a chair, unable to move without pain.

Cast
 Lionel Barrymore as Dr. Leonard B. Gillespie
 Van Johnson as Dr. Randall "Red" Ames
 Marilyn Maxwell as Ruth Edley
 Keye Luke as Dr. Lee Wong How
 Ava Gardner as Jean Brown
 Alma Kruger as Molly Bird
 Rags Ragland as Hobart Genet
 Nell Craig as Nurse "Nosey" Parker

Box office
According to MGM records the film earned $600,000 in the US and Canada and $268,000 elsewhere resulting in a profit of $121,000.

See also
List of American films of 1944

References

External links

1944 films
1944 comedy-drama films
American black-and-white films
American comedy-drama films
Films directed by Willis Goldbeck
Films scored by Nathaniel Shilkret
Films set in New York City
Films set in hospitals
Metro-Goldwyn-Mayer films
1940s English-language films
1940s American films